Mohamed Shavin is a Maldivian film actor.

Career
In 2000, he played the role of Fayaz, an ignorant husband who is deeply in love with a patient suffering from congenital heart disease in Abdul Faththaah's television drama series Dhoapatta. Starring alongside Niuma Mohamed, Sheela Najeeb and Jamsheedha Ahmed, the series centers on unrequited love and complications of a relationship within and beyond marriage.

Shavin had three releases in 2001. In his first release, he starred alongside Yoosuf Shafeeu, Sheela Najeeb, Jamsheedha Ahmed and Ibrahim Giyas in Amjad Ibrahim-directed Aaah (2001) which revolves around two siblings involved in family business and the downfall of the younger brother's love life when he discovers his fiancé is already married to an abusive husband. It was followed by Ali Shameel's drama film Hithi Nimun (2001) featuring opposite Mariyam Nisha and Sheereen Abdul Wahid, which follows the storyline of a stubborn young man (played by Shavin) who abandons his girlfriend when he discovers about her pregnancy. In his third and final film of the year, Shavin starred an aspiring photographer working for a magazine in Aslam Rasheed's romantic thriller film Dheevaanaa which was an unofficial remake of Ram Gopal Varma's romantic thriller Pyaar Tune Kya Kiya (2001) starring Urmila Matondkar, Fardeen Khan and Sonali Kulkarni. The film narrates the story of a woman who falls in love with an already married photographer and sets out to get what she wants, no matter what the consequences may be. The following year, he collaborated with Amjad Ibrahim for his drama film Kahvalhah Dhaandhen (2002), co-starring Sheela Najeeb,.

Shavin next featured in Amjad Ibrahim's next directorial venture Sandhuravirey 2 (2004); a sequel to his 2002 horror film Sandhuravirey which presented Yoosuf Shafeeu and Mariyam Nisha in lead roles. Starring additional cast including Zeenath Abbas, Niuma Mohamed and Sheereen Abdul Wahid, the film follows a storyline of a daughter jinn avenging the death of its mother and sister on Dhiyash's family. Similar to its prequel, the film received negative response from critics. He next appeared in Yoosuf Shafeeu-directed horror film Edhathuru (2004) as one of the eight friends who go on a picnic to an island and how they fight to survive the horrific incidents that befall them. The film was appreciated by critics, specifically praising its sound effect and was a commercial success.

Shavin received his first Gaumee Film Award nomination as the Best Supporting Actor for his "authentic" performance as the sacrificing boyfriend in Abdul Faththaah's critically praised romantic film Vehey Vaarey Therein (2003). Featuring Yoosuf Shafeeu, Khadheeja Ibrahim Didi, Jamsheedha Ahmed, Amira Ismail and Aminath Rasheedha in crucial roles, the film narrates the story of unrequited love, and proved to be one of the highest-grossing Maldivian films of the year. This was followed by Amjad Ibrahim's romantic drama film Hithuge Edhun (2006) which narrates the story of a disabled man. He played the role of Nahid, a committed husband who was unaware of his wife's affair.

Filmography

Feature film

Television

Short film

Accolades

References 

Living people
People from Malé
21st-century Maldivian male actors
Maldivian male film actors
Year of birth missing (living people)